Guillemard is a surname. Notable people with the surname include:

 A. G. Guillemard (1845–1909), English rugby union player
 Andy Guillemard-Noble, Puerto Rican attorney
 Franck Guillemard (born 1975), French ice hockey player
 Laurence Guillemard (1862–1951), British colonial official